Middlefield is a community in the Canadian province of Nova Scotia, located in the Region of Queens Municipality.

Parks
Ten Mile Lake Provincial Park

References
Middlefield on Destination Nova Scotia

Communities in the Region of Queens Municipality
General Service Areas in Nova Scotia